Tiffany Michele Vollmer (born July 22, 1973) is an American film producer, make-up artist, and voice actress. She formerly worked for Funimation.

Biography

Career
As a voice actress, Vollmer was cast as Bulma in 1999 for Funimation's English dub of the third season of Dragon Ball Z, and went on to voice the character in the remainder of the series, as well as the redub of the first two seasons. She also voiced Bulma in Dragon Ball and Dragon Ball GT, as well as ten feature films, a TV special, and fourteen video games. She also voiced a few smaller, additional characters in the Dragon Ball franchise, in addition to minor roles on Yu Yu Hakusho and Case Closed. In 2009, she was replaced by Monica Rial as the voice of Bulma for the franchise, starting with Dragon Ball Z Kai and every piece of Dragon Ball media after it.

Vollmer also worked on a couple of live action films, both in front of and behind the camera. She was the associate producer of the half hour short, Placebo (2006) (co-starring three of her fellow Funimation VAs Laura Bailey, Meredith McCoy, and Mike McFarland). She also worked on the 2008 film Ciao, as actress, key makeup artist, and head of wardrobe. She provided makeup and wardrobe for the 2008 film Stalker's Dating Guide. In 2010, Vollmer was the assistant director and art director for the horror film, Evidence of a Haunting which was released in Fall 2010.

In 2011 Ms. Vollmer relocated to New Orleans, Louisiana to continue her work as a film maker, artist, designer and actress. In 2019 she moved to Dallas after accepting a Department Chair position at MediaTech Institute.

English dubbing roles

(as Bulma in Dragon Ball franchise)

Series
 Dragon Ball
 Dragon Ball Z
 Dragon Ball GT

Film
 Dragon Ball: Mystical Adventure
 Dragon Ball Z: Dead Zone
 Dragon Ball Z: The World's Strongest
 Dragon Ball Z: The Tree of Might
 Dragon Ball Z: Lord Slug
 Dragon Ball Z: Broly - The Legendary Super Saiyan
 Dragon Ball Z: Bojack Unbound
 Dragon Ball Z: Fusion Reborn
 Dragon Ball Z: Wrath of the Dragon
 Dragon Ball: The Path to Power

Special
 Dragon Ball Z: The History of Trunks

Video games
 Dragon Ball Z: Budokai
 Dragon Ball Z: Budokai 2
 Dragon Ball Z: Budokai 3
 Dragon Ball Z: Sagas
 Dragon Ball Z: Budokai Tenkaichi
 Dragon Ball Z: Budokai Tenkaichi 2
 Dragon Ball Z: Shin Budokai - Another Road
 Dragon Ball Z: Harukanaru Densetsu
 Dragon Ball Z: Budokai Tenkaichi 3
 Dragon Ball: Origins
 Dragon Ball Z: Infinite World
 Dragon Ball: Revenge of King Piccolo
 Dragon Ball: Raging Blast
 Dragon Ball: Origins 2

Other appearances

Anime
Manager in Yu Yu Hakusho (1 episode)
Betsy in Case Closed (2 episodes)
Juliana in Dragon Ball Z: Fusion Reborn (Movie)

Filmography

Live action 
Placebo (2006) (associate producer only)
Doctor in Ciao (2008) (also key makeup artist and wardrobe)
Stalker's Dating Guide (2008) (makeup artist and wardrobe)
Evidence of a Haunting (2010) (assistant director, art director)

Interviews 
Invasion Anime (2002)
Dragon Ball Z: Budokai 3: Behind the Screams (2004)

References

External links 

1974 births
Living people
American video game actresses
American voice actresses
Place of birth missing (living people)
21st-century American actresses